Michael Kantarovski (born 22 May 1995) is an Australian professional  footballer who plays as a central midfielder for Lambton Jaffas in the National Premier Leagues Northern NSW. He is the younger brother of Newcastle Jets midfielder Ben Kantarovski.

References

External links

Living people
Association football midfielders
Australian soccer players
National Premier Leagues players
A-League Men players
Newcastle Jets FC players
1995 births
Australian people of Macedonian descent